Israel Citkowitz (6 February 1909 – 4 May 1974) was a Polish-born American pianist, composer, teacher and critic.

Early life
Israel Citkowitz was born on 6 February 1909 in Skierniewice, Poland, the first of two children to Ida Frankon and Abraham Citkowitz. He was brought to the United States when he was three. Citkowitz had a sister called Rebecca.

As a teenager, Citkowitz studied composition with Aaron Copland and Roger Sessions, and counterpoint in Paris with Nadia Boulanger.

Career 
From 1927 to 1929, Citkowitz was a member of Shakespeare and Company.

During the 1930s, Citkowitz published music criticism in Modern Music and Musical Mercury. Among his pieces was the first English-language introduction to Schenker's ideas, The Role of Heinrich Schenker.

In 1939, Citkowitz was appointed teacher of counterpoint and composition, which included Song Cycle to Words of Joyce, String Quartet and the choral music, The Lamb, at the Dalcroze School of Music in New York City. Among his students were the English composer Leo Smith, and later, the American conductor Richard Kapp.

Citkowitz wrote poetry including Autumn and The Prodigals of Summer.

Discography 

 But Yesterday Is Not Today (1977). New World Records — NW 243
 Modern America Art Songs (Unknown). New Editions (2) — NE 2

Personal life
On 15 September 1935, Citkowitz married Helen Margaret Simon in Manhattan, New York. They had two children. The couple divorced in 1948. On 25 June 2013, Citkowitz's daughter with Simon, Dr. Elena Citkowitz, died from cancer, aged 73.

After his 1948 divorce, Citkowitz lived in his Carnegie Hall studio.

On 15 August 1959, Citkowitz married the English writer and heir to the Guinness beer fortune, Lady Caroline Blackwood, 22 years his junior; they had two daughters, one of whom is Eugenia Citkowitz. The couple divorced in 1972. A deathbed admission by Blackwood revealed that one of their children, Ivana Lowell, was not in fact Citkowitz's child, but that her biological father was one of her boyfriends, screenwriter Ivan Moffat. On 22 June 1978, Citkowitz's eldest daughter with Blackwood, Natalya, died from postural asphyxia due to a drug overdose, aged 17.

Death 
Citkowitz died on 4 May 1974 at his apartment in Westminster, London, where he had been living for the last five years. He was 65.

References

1909 births
1974 deaths
20th-century composers
Piano pedagogues